At 21:15 hrs on 28 July 2003 a bomb placed under a seat of a B.E.S.T. bus exploded on the busy Lal Bahadur Shastri Marg in Ghatkopar. The bomb was placed in the rear of the bus, killing four people and injuring 32. A man who was riding a motorcycle behind the bus and a woman who was in a rickshaw travelling near the bus were among those killed. An eyewitness claims that the woman was thrown at least ten feet away from the rickshaw and died on the spot.

This was the fourth in a series of five bombings against the city within a period of eight months. Other bombings include

 2002 Mumbai bus bombing
 January 2003 Mumbai bombing
 March 2003 Mumbai bombing
 August 2003 Mumbai bombings

External links
  Blast in Ghatkopar in Mumbai, 4 killed and 32 injured.

21st-century mass murder in India
Mass murder in 2003
Terrorist incidents in Mumbai
Improvised explosive device bombings in India
History of Mumbai (1947–present)
Terrorist incidents in India in 2003
Bus bombings in Asia
2000s in Mumbai
July 2003 events in India